Margarita "Tingting" de los Reyes Cojuangco (born Margarita Manzano de los Reyes on April 29, 1944) is a Filipina politician, philanthropist and socialite. She was the former Chairman of the Kabalikat ng Malayang Pilipino (Kampi) party and a member of the Council of Philippine Affairs (COPA). She is a columnist in The Philippine Star, and was a candidate for a seat in the Senate in the 2013 Philippine Senate Election. Cojuangco lost in the election. She is the aunt of the late former Philippine President Benigno Aquino III.

Early life and education
Cojuangco was born on April 29, 1944, to Geronimo delos Reyes and Lita Manzano. In 1962, she married José Cojuangco, Jr. She is mother to one of the popular equestriennes of the country, Mikaela "Mikee" Cojuangco (who is married to Robert Jaworski Jr.). Their other children are Dr. Luisita "Liaa" C. Bautista,  (married to Emmanuel Bautista), Josephine "Pin" C. Guingona (married to Francisco Javier Guingona), Margarita Demetria "Maimai" C. Zini (married to Andrea Zini), and Regina Patricia Jose "China" C. Gonzalez (married to Gino Gonzalez).

Cojuangco studied at the University of Santo Tomas, finished her master's degree in National Security Administration (MNSA) at the National Defense College, and holds doctorate degrees in Criminology and Philippine History.

Career
She served as Tarlac Provincial Governor for two terms in 1992 until 1998. In 1998, she ran for re-election for a third and final term but lost the election. She tried to reclaim her old post in 2001 but still lost. Tingting Cojuangco is the president of the Philippine Public Safety College, Bureau of Fire Protection, and Bureau  of Jail Management and Penology. She was the Undersecretary for Special Concerns of the Department of the Interior and Local Government (March 10 – September 24, 2004); She was the Governor of Tarlac province from 1992 to 1998, and the President of the Philippine Public Safety College for eight years. She served as a Presidential Assistant to Gloria Macapagal Arroyo (2001-2004); full colonel, Reserve Forces of the Philippine Army (1989–present); and columnist of Philippine Star (1999–present).

She is known for her humanitarian projects and her work among Muslim communities. She has participated in the peace talks with the Moro National Liberation Front.

Cojuangco has also taken on Gawad Kalinga as her pet philanthropy.

Awards
 Part of the Philippine Tatler's Who's Who of the Philippines, 2009
 One of Harper's Bazaar's 100 Most Beautiful Women in the World, 1968

References

1944 births
People from Tarlac
People from Quezon City
PDP–Laban politicians
University of Santo Tomas alumni
Filipino Roman Catholics
Living people
Filipino columnists
People from Maguindanao
Lakas–CMD politicians
United Nationalist Alliance politicians
Cojuangco family
Assistants to the President of the Philippines
Arroyo administration personnel
The Philippine Star people
Filipino women columnists
21st-century Filipino women politicians
21st-century Filipino politicians